The Van Dievoet family is a Belgian family originating from the Duchy of Brabant. It descends from the Seven Noble Houses of Brussels and its members have been bourgeois (burgess) of that city since the 1600s. It formed, at the end of the 17th century, a now extinct noble Parisian branch which used the name Vandive.

Origins 
This family descends from Gilles van Dievoet (d. before 1672), bourgeois of Brussels, who wed, in a first marriage on 13 November 1650, in the Chapel Church, Catherine Slachmeulder. And, in a second marriage on 31 July 1660, in  Saint Gudula, Gertrude Zeevaert.

Brussels branch 
The Brussels branch is the only extant branch of the Van Dievoet family. It has produced notable merchants, artists, architects, athletes, and executives, as well as prominent judges, lawyers and law historians.

Notable members 

Peter van Dievoet (1661–1729), famous sculptor in London and Brussels, councillor to the city of Brussels.
 Pierre van Dievoet, musician (1781–1825).
Jean-Louis van Dievoet [fr] (1777–1854), jurist and Secretary of the Belgian supreme court.
Augustus van Dievoet (1803–1865), supreme court advocate and legal historian.
 Léon van Dievoet (1838–1908) ship-owner, associate of Lambert Straatman.
 Camille van Dievoet (1842–1931), agent of the National Bank of Belgium, Knight of the Order of Leopold, First Class Civic Cross, Commemorative Medal of the reign of Leopold II.
Jules van Dievoet (1844–1917), supreme court advocate.
Eugène van Dievoet II (1862–1937), architect, major (military engineering), Knight of the Order of Léopold (Military Division), Officer of the Order of the Crown, Commemorative Medal of the reign of Léopold II, Military Cross (First Class).
Henri van Dievoet (1869–1931), architect.
Gabriel van Dievoet (1875–1934), Art nouveau artist.
 Édouard van Dievoet (1875–1961), doctor of law and political and administrative sciences, General Manager of the Compagnie Internationale des Wagons-Lits, Officer of the France's Legion of Honour, Knight of the Order of Leopold, Officer of the Order of the Crown.
 Georges van Dievoet (1876–1932), engineer, Knight of the Order of Leopold, delegate of the National Committee of the province of Namur during the Great War.
 Jules Édouard van Dievoet (1878–1941), lawyer at the Brussels Court of appeal. Knight of the Order of Leopold, Commemorative Medal of the 1914–1918 War and the Victory Medal 1914–1918.
 Albert van Dievoet (1886–1980), honorary director and general manager in Brussels of the Compagnie Internationale des Wagons-Lits (48 years of service), director of Thomas Cook & Sons, director of the Seven Noble Houses of Brussels organization, Officer of the Order of Léopold, Commander of the Order of Léopold II, Croix de guerre with bronze lion, Fire Cross 1914–1918, Victory Medal 1914–1918, Officer of the France's Legion of honour, Commander of the Royal Order of Merit of Bulgaria, Commander of the Order of Adolphe of Nassau.
 Paul van Dievoet (1896–1947), architect of the municipality of Schaerbeek.
Germaine van Dievoet, (1899–1990), competitive swimmer, Bronze medal of the Sporting Merit, participated in the 1920 Antwerp Summer Olympics.
 Pierre van Dievoet (1904–1982), engineer, Knight of the Order of Leopold, captain of the Resistance, member of the Secret Army, Brumagne Squadron, Deputy Chief of Staff of Zone III of the Secret Army (Flanders).
Léon van Dievoet II (1907–1993), architect, Knight of the Orders of Leopold and Crown.
Jean-Paul van Dievoet (1928–2005), civil, electrical, mechanical, and naval engineer, Director General of the Belgonucléaire S.A., Pres. of Transnubel, VP of INB (Kalkar), Pres. of the Belgian Nuclear Society, VP of the Committee for Nuclear development and the Fuel Cycle of OECD-NEA, 1st Chairman and Honorary Fellow of the European Nuclear Society, Officer of the Order of Leopold.
Florence van Dievoet née Descampe (b. 1969), veteran professional golfer.
Ariane van Dievoet (b. 1988), interior architect, minimalist furniture and product designer, founder of design studio Avandi in Brooklyn in 2011.

Parisian branch 

The Parisian and noble branch of the family, which used the name Vandive, descends from Philippe and produced notable goldsmiths and councillors to the Kings of France as well as a major printer. It became extinct in 1802.

Notable members 

 Sire Philippe van Dievoet called Vandive, écuyer (1654–1738), councillor to the king, goldsmith of Louis XIV and consul of Paris.
Guillaume Vandive, (1680–1706), printer of the Dauphin.
Sire Balthazar Philippe Vandive, goldsmith and consul of Paris
Nicolas Félix Vandive, écuyer, lawyer at the Parlement de Paris, Clerk of the Hearing at the King's Council, Secretary-Advisor to King House and Crown of France.

Portrait gallery

Heraldry

Genealogy 
Gilles van Dievoet († before 1672) x Catherine Slachmeulder
Philippe van Dievoet called Vandive (1654–1738) x Anne Martinot
Vandive family
Gilles van Dievoet († before 1672) x Gertrude Zeevaert
Peter van Dievoet (1661–1729) x Dorothée de Witte
Jean-Baptiste van Dievoet I(1663–1751) x Anne van der Borcht
Jean-Baptiste van Dievoet II (1704–1776) x Élisabeth van der Meulen
Jean-Baptiste van Dievoet III (1747–1821) x Anne-Marie Lambrechts
Jean-Baptiste van Dievoet IV (1775–1862), JUL x Catherine-Jeanne Cuerens
Jean-Louis van Dievoet (fr) (1777–1854) x Jeanne Wittouck
Augustus van Dievoet (1803–1865) x Antoinette Coniart
Jules van Dievoet (1844–1917) x Marguerite Anspach
Jules Édouard van Dievoet  (1878–1941)x Marguerite Leclercq
Eugène van Dievoet I (1804–1858) x Hortense Poelaert
Léon Philippe van Dievoet (1838–1908) x Hermine Straatman
Henri van Dievoet (1869–1931) x Eugenie Masson
Paul van Dievoet (1896–1947)
Germaine van Dievoet (1899–1990) x Willy Dessecker (1901–1996)
Gabriel van Dievoet (1875–1934) x Alice Demets (1878–1945)
Léon van Dievoet II (1907–1993) x Madeleine Vande Weyer (1916–2000)
Camille Van Dievoet (1842–1931) x Lucie Sancke
Albert van Dievoet (1886–1980) x Anne François

Allied families

See also 

 Belgian Resistance
 Bourgeois of Brussels
 Bourgeois of Paris
 Château du Moisnil
 Guillaume Delcourt
 Dievoet, for other families with the same surname
 Dievoort, a surname of the same etymology
 Drapery Court of Brussels
 Guilds of Brussels
 Pipenpoy family
 Secret Army
 Société des douze
 Rue du Marché aux Fromages

 Legion of Honour
 List of Legion of Honour recipients by name (V)
 Legion of Honour Museum

Notes and references

Further reading 

 Alain van Dievoet, « Un disciple belge de Grinling Gibbons, le sculpteur Pierre van Dievoet (1661–1729) et son œuvre à Londres et Bruxelles », in: Le Folklore brabançon, March 1980, n° 225, pp. 65–91.
 Alain van Dievoet, « Généalogie de la famille van Dievoet originaire de Bruxelles, dite van Dive à Paris », in: Le Parchemin, ed. Genealogical and Heraldic Office of Belgium, Brussels, 1986, n° 245, pp. 273–293.
 Alain van Dievoet, « Quand le savoir-faire des orfèvres bruxellois brillait à Versailles », in: Cahiers bruxellois, Brussels, 2004, pp. 19–66.
 Madame Dolez, « Les Anspach d'Est en Ouest », in: Le Parchemin, ed. Genealogical and Heraldic Office of Belgium, Brussels, n° 240, 1985, pp. 380–381, note 9. (For the descendants of Augustus Van Dievoet)
 F. By, « Famille van Dievoet : Artistes, de père en fils », in: Le Vif/L'Express numéro spécial Bruxelles : la saga des grandes familles, 26th year n°47 (Le Vif) and n°2993 (L'Express), 21–27 November 2008, p. 121.
 Jean-François Houtart, Anciennes familles de Belgique, Brussels, 2008, p. 393.
Walériane Dubois, « Ces dynasties qui ont bâti Bruxelles : Les Van Dievoet – Créateurs polyvalents », in Le Vif Weekend, n°8, 5 November 2020, p. 65.

External links 

 La famille van Dievoet, l'art et l'architecture on puzzlavie.be (in French)
 Ascendants of Augustus Van Dievoet and his brother Eugene (in French)

 
Belgian families
Seven Noble Houses of Brussels
House of Coudenbergh
House of Roodenbeke
House of Serhuyghs
House of Sweerts
House of Sleeus
House of Steenweeghs
House of Serroelofs
French noble families
People from Brussels
People from Brussels-Capital Region
Noble families
Duchy of Brabant